Section.80 is the debut studio album by American rapper Kendrick Lamar. It was released on July 2, 2011, by Top Dawg Entertainment (TDE). In the years leading up to its release, Lamar previously produced various mixtapes under the moniker K.Dot. In 2010, Lamar released Overly Dedicated, his fourth solo mixtape. Shortly after its release, he began working on Section.80.

The production of Section.80 was mainly handled by TDE in-house producers from production group Digi+Phonics, as well as THC, Tommy Black, Wyldfyer, Terrace Martin and J. Cole. A concept album, it features lyrical themes delivered by Lamar such as the 1980s crack epidemic, racism and the medication tolerance of Generation Y. The album features guest appearances from GLC, Colin Munroe, Ashtrobot, BJ the Chicago Kid, Schoolboy Q, Ab-Soul and vocals from late singer-songwriter Alori Joh.

Section.80 received generally positive reviews from critics upon its release. The album debuted at number 113 on the US Billboard 200 and as of February 2014, it has sold 130,000 copies domestically. In April 2017, it was certified gold by the Recording Industry Association of America (RIAA).

Background
Prior to the album's release, Kendrick Lamar released various mixtapes under the K.Dot moniker. The first of these mixtapes, titled Youngest Head Nigga in Charge, landed Lamar a recording contract with Top Dawg Entertainment. Through Top Dawg Entertainment, Lamar would release four mixtapes, including Overly Dedicated. Lamar felt compelled to create the album after seeing a friend of his go to jail for twenty-five years and experiencing the pain of such an event.

Recording
Lamar began working on the album sometime in January 2011. The album was recorded at Top Dawg Studios in Carson, California. Most of the album was written in Lamar's mother's kitchen and his tour bus. While recording the album, Lamar wished for it to be "as organic as possible," at times leaving songs unfinished for extended periods of time.

Music and lyrics
Section.80 is a concept album that involves the lives of Tammy and Keisha as it explains the personal hardships in their lives. "Tammy's Song (Her Evils)" revolves around two girls cheating on their boyfriends after discovering they were unfaithful, and eventually sleeping with each other because they can't trust men; "Keisha's Song (Her Pain)" is about a prostitute who seeks comfort and control, only to her demise.

Lamar has stated that he created the album to discuss his generation. Lamar dwells on a variety of subjects, such as the crack epidemic occurred in the 80s and Ronald Reagan.

On "A.D.H.D", Lamar addresses "getting fucked up, going to parties, and just being carefree," while "Kush & Corinthians" notes that justice and morals are rarely cut and dried. The album's lead single and final song, "HiiiPoWeR", explains the "HiiiPoWeR" movement promoted by Lamar and his Top Dawg Entertainment labelmates. The song came from Lamar's interactions with fellow rapper J. Cole and TDE president Punch.

The song "Ronald Reagan Era" features uncredited vocal recordings by RZA, which Kendrick mentions in an Interview with Complex in 2011 were orchestrated by DJ Fricktion from London, who at the time was working with RZA on various records.

Marketing and sales
Section.80 was released on July 2, 2011. In its first week, the album sold 5,000 copies in the United States and debuted at number 113 on the US Billboard 200, with minimal mainstream media promotion and coverage. Within a two-week period, the album sold a total of 9,000 copies in the United States, and as of February 2014, the album has sold 130,000 copies domestically. On April 14, 2017, the album was certified gold by the Recording Industry Association of America (RIAA), for combined sales and album-equivalent units of over 500,000 units.

Critical reception

Section.80 was met with generally positive reviews. At Metacritic, which assigns a normalized rating out of 100 to reviews from professional publications, the album received an average score of 80, based on 11 reviews.

Andres Tardio of HipHopDX praised the album, writing that Lamar "may have been searching for answers, but that journey allowed him to find out of this year's most outstanding albums with Section.80." Reviewing the album for Pitchfork, Tom Breihan believed that, "self-serious flaws and all, Section.80 still stands as a powerful document of a tremendously promising young guy figuring out his voice." In the opinion of XXL journalist Adam Fleischer, the record reveals "its author's brain is neither lost nor useless, as he weaves together carefully constructed thoughts before spewing raps on each of the project's 16 tracks, ensuring nothing is disposable or without purpose." David Amidon from PopMatters compared Lamar to an Ice Cube early in his career, as "he's only telling us what he sees, and while he might not offer solutions as often as [Ice Cube] did, he's certainly able to paint us vivid a picture." Tom Hull said Lamar "runs a song about 'niggas and ho's' so far into the ground he can raise a flagpole in top of it, but also recalls the evils of the Reagan Era, which is pretty good for a guy who was just born as Iran-Contra piled up."

Pitchfork placed the album at number 45 on its list of the "Top 50 albums of 2011". Complex named the album the 7th best album of 2011. In honor of Section.80s fifth anniversary, Forbes columnist Ogden Payne wrote an article explaining how the album had propelled Lamar into "hip-hop royalty," deeming it "the genesis to Kendrick Lamar successfully balancing social commentary with mass appeal, while simultaneously laying the foundation for his label as King Kendrick." NME placed the album at number three on their list of "101 Albums To Hear Before You Die" in 2014.

Track listing
Songwriting credits adapted from BMI and ASCAP.

Notes
  signifies a co-producer
 "A.D.H.D" contains additional vocals from Ab-Soul
 "HiiiPoWer" contains additional vocals from Alori Joh

Personnel
Credits are adapted from AllMusic.

 Kendrick Lamar – primary artist
 Sounwave – producer 
 Terrace Martin – producer
 J. Cole – producer
 Wyldfyer – producer
 Tommy Black – producer
 Dave Free – producer
 Derek "MixedByAli" Ali – mix engineer

 Ab-Soul – featured artist
 BJ the Chicago Kid – featured artist
 Colin Munroe – featured artist
 Schoolboy Q – featured artist 
 Ashtrobot – featured artist

Charts

Weekly charts

Year-end charts

Certifications

References

External links
  – Relevant Mindset

2011 debut albums
Concept albums
Albums produced by J. Cole
Albums produced by Terrace Martin
Albums produced by Sounwave
Albums produced by Tae Beast
Albums produced by Dave Free
Albums produced by Willie B
Kendrick Lamar albums
Top Dawg Entertainment albums